is a Japanese actress from Nagoya,

Spotted at a beauty contest sponsored by the Nikkatsu studio, Matsubara made her debut in 1961 at age 16 in Yoru no chōsensha. Matsubara won popularity and became one of the representative actresses of the Nikkatsu. She appeared in over 100 films at Nikkatsu. Her representative films included Tokyo Drifter (1966) and Outlaw series.

Selected filmography

Film

Television

Honours
Kinuyo Tanaka Award (2016)
Sochi Film Festival Best Actress Award (2016) : Yuzu no Ha Yurete

References

External links 
 Official agency profile 
 Chieko Matsubara at Kinenote

1945 births
Living people
Japanese film actresses
People from Nagoya